The Fouquette river (in French: rivière Fouquette) is a tributary of the southern coast of the St. Lawrence River where it flows in front of the "Les Pèlerins" islands, in Saint-André-de-Kamouraska. This river flows in the municipalities of Sainte-Hélène-de-Kamouraska, Saint-André-de-Kamouraska and Saint-Alexandre, in the Kamouraska Regional County Municipality, in the administrative region of Bas-Saint-Laurent, in province of Quebec, in Canada.

Geography 

  northeast in Sainte-Hélène-de-Kamouraska, to route 230 West;
  north-west, then north-east, to the Route de la Station which crosses the hamlet "Saint-André-Station";
  north-east in Saint-André-de-Kamouraska, including a  segment in Saint-Alexandre, up to the Lapointe road;
  north, to highway 20, which it crosses;
  northeast, to route 289;
  north, to the Saint-André-de-Kamouraska limit;
  north-west, flowing near the rivière des Caps, up to the route 132 which it crosses;
  south-west, up to its confluence.

Toponymy 
The term “Fouquette” constitutes a surname of French origin.

The toponym “Rivière Fouquette” was formalized on December 5, 1968, by the Commission de toponymie du Québec.

See also  

 List of rivers of Quebec

References 

Rivers of Bas-Saint-Laurent
Kamouraska Regional County Municipality